Robert Barrett Boyd (March 7, 1928 – May 14, 2009) was an American football end and defensive back in the National Football League (NFL), playing for the Los Angeles Rams for eight seasons. His most spectacular season was in 1954, when he caught 53 passes for 1,212 yards and 6 touchdowns.

While at Loyola Marymount University, Boyd won the 100-yard dash at the 1950 NCAA Championships.

References

External links
 

1928 births
2009 deaths
American football defensive backs
American football ends
American male sprinters
Loyola Lions football players
Loyola Marymount Lions men's track and field athletes
Los Angeles Rams players
Western Conference Pro Bowl players
Sportspeople from Riverside, California
Players of American football from Riverside, California
African-American players of American football
African-American male track and field athletes
20th-century African-American sportspeople
21st-century African-American people